King Fahd or Fahd of Saudi Arabia (1921–2005) was a Saudi monarch.

King Fahd or King Fahad may also refer to:

King Fahad Academy, an independent school in Acton, London, England
King Fahd Academy (Germany), a school in Lannesdorf, Bonn, Germany
King Fahad Air Base, in Taif, Saudi Arabia
King Fahd Bridge, in Bamako, Mali
King Fahd Causeway, connecting Saudi Arabia and Bahrain
King Fahd Complex for the Printing of the Holy Quran, in Medina, Saudi Arabia
King Fahd's Fountain, in Jeddah, Saudi Arabia
King Fahd Hospital (disambiguation)
King Fahd International Airport, in Dammam, Saudi Arabia
King Fahd International Stadium, in Riyadh, Saudi Arabia
King Fahd Medical City, Riyadh, Saudi Arabia
King Fahd Mosque (disambiguation)
King Fahd National Library, Riyadh, Saudi Arabia
King Fahd Naval Academy, Jubail, Saudi Arabia
King Fahd Security College, Riyadh, Saudi Arabia
King Fahd Stadium, Ta'if, in Taif, Saudi Arabia
King Fahd University of Petroleum and Minerals in Dhahran, Saudi Arabia

See also